Prespa e Vogël and Golloborda are regions in Albania.
See the articles on the individual regions:
Mala Prespa
Golloborda